In mathematics, a pairing is an R-bilinear map from the Cartesian product of two R-modules, where the underlying ring R is commutative.

Definition
Let R be a commutative ring with unit, and let M, N and L be R-modules.

A pairing is any R-bilinear map . That is, it satisfies

,

 and 

for any  and any  and any . Equivalently, a pairing is an R-linear map

where  denotes the tensor product of M and N.

A pairing can also be considered as an R-linear map
, which matches the first definition by setting
.

A pairing is called perfect if the above map  is an isomorphism of R-modules.

A pairing is called non-degenerate on the right if for the above map we have that  for all  implies ; similarly,  is called non-degenerate on the left if  for all  implies .

In particular, this implies , while bilinearity shows . Thus, for an alternating pairing, .

Examples
Any scalar product on a real vector space V is a pairing (set ,  in the above definitions).

The determinant map (2 × 2 matrices over k) → k  can be seen as a pairing .

For instance, Hardie et al. present an explicit construction of the map using poset models.

Pairings in cryptography

In cryptography, often the following specialized definition is used:

Let  be additive groups and  a multiplicative group, all of prime order .

A pairing is a map: 

for which the following holds:
 Bilinearity: 
 Non-degeneracy: 
 For practical purposes,  has to be computable in an efficient manner

Note that it is also common in cryptographic literature for all groups to be written in multiplicative notation. 

In cases when , the pairing is called symmetric. As  is cyclic, the map  will be commutative; that is, for any , we have . Therefore .

The Weil pairing is an important concept in elliptic curve cryptography; e.g., it may be used to attack certain elliptic curves (see MOV attack).  It and other pairings have been used to develop identity-based encryption schemes.

Slightly different usages of the notion of pairing
Scalar products on complex vector spaces are sometimes called pairings, although they are not bilinear.
For example, in representation theory, one has a scalar product on the characters of complex representations of a finite group which is frequently called character pairing.

See also 
Dual system
Yoneda product

References

External links
 The Pairing-Based Crypto Library

Linear algebra
Module theory
Pairing-based cryptography